Šíd is a village in Lučenec municipality, Banská Bystrica Region, Slovakia.

References

Villages in Slovakia